George Lee Rose (January 1, 1942 – January 19, 2023) was an American professional football cornerback in the National Football League. He played four seasons for the Minnesota Vikings (1964–1966) and the New Orleans Saints (1967). 

Rose died in Brunswick, Georgia, on January 19, 2023, at the age of 81.

Notes

1942 births
2023 deaths
People from Brunswick, Georgia
Players of American football from Georgia (U.S. state)
American football cornerbacks
Auburn Tigers football players
Minnesota Vikings players
New Orleans Saints players